People's Commissariat for Posts and Telegraphs may refer to:
 People's Commissariat for Posts and Telegraphs of the RSFSR (1917–1923)
 People's Commissariat for Posts and Telegraphs of the USSR (1923–1932)

See also 
 Council of People's Commissars
 Minister for Posts and Telegraphs
 Minister of Posts, Telegraphs, and Telephones
 Ministry of Post and Telegraphs (Poland)
 People's Commissariat for Communications of the USSR
 Post & Telegraph
 P&TLuxembourg
 Post and Telegraph Department (disambiguation)
 Postal, telegraph and telephone service
 Postes, télégraphes et téléphones (France)